Harlyn (meaning facing a pool) is a small village on the north coast of Cornwall, England, United Kingdom. It is situated inland from Harlyn Bay (meaning court cove) three miles from Padstow and about one mile from St. Merryn.

Harlyn Bay is a family and surfing beach and is suitable for novice surfers. Near the beach are a caravan park and a pub called The Harlyn Inn. Many of the houses in Harlyn are holiday lets. 
East of Harlyn Bay is the village and beach of Trevone and west of Harlyn are Cataclews Point (meaning grey rock), Mother Ivey's Bay and Trevose Head. Further west, the beaches at Constantine Bay, Porthcothan and Treyarnon are linked by the South West Coast Path.

Harlyn lies within the Cornwall Area of Outstanding Natural Beauty (AONB).

The village is comprised to a large extent of second homes, and is quiet for much of the year.

The beach and most of the land on the cliff was brought over a century ago by a wealthy industrialist family, who still own the houses on the cliff top.

The Gold Lunulae of Harlyn

In 1865 a labourer found two wafer-thin crescents of gold known as lunulae at Harlyn Bay. They probably date from the early Bronze Age, and were probably deposited as grave goods, as there are several prehistoric burial mounds nearby. The shape of these lunulae indicates a symbolic meaning. They represent the crescent horns of the moon, and may thus have been objects of great ritual and ceremonial significance. They are preserved at the Royal Cornwall Museum, Truro.

In 2014, after heavy storms had battered the cliffs of Harlyn Bay, local residents and beach users discovered the storms had uncovered an ancient burial cist containing human remains. The remains were recovered for further investigation, but it is assumed that they belong to a female from either the Iron or Bronze Age periods.

References

External links

Villages in Cornwall
Beaches of Cornwall